This is a list of Turkish football transfers for the 2006–07 season. Only moves from the Süper Lig are listed.

The first transfer window of the season ran from the end of the 2005–06 season to August 31, 2006. The second transfer window ran from January 1, 2007, to January 31, 2007.

Summer transfer window

June

July

August

Winter transfer window

December

January

Unsorted

References

Turkish
Transfers
Turkish
2006-07